In chemistry, the term chromogen refers to a colourless (or faintly coloured) chemical compound that can be converted by chemical reaction into a compound which can be described as "coloured". There is no universally agreed definition of the term. Various dictionaries give the following definitions:
 A substance capable of conversion into a pigment or dye.
 Any substance that can become a pigment or coloring matter, a substance in organic fluids that forms colored compounds when oxidized, or a compound, not itself a dye, that can become a dye.
 Any substance, itself without color, giving origin to a coloring matter.
In biochemistry the term has a rather different meaning. The following are found in various dictionaries.
 A precursor of a biochemical pigment
 A pigment-producing microorganism
 Any of certain bacteria that produce a pigment  
 A strongly pigmented or pigment-generating organelle, organ, or microorganism.

Applications in chemistry
In chromogenic photography, film or paper contains one or many layers of silver halide (AgX) emulsion, along with dye couplers that, in combination with processing chemistry, form visible dyes.

Applications in biochemistry and medicine
The Runyon classification classifies mycobacteria by chromogenic properties.

References

Color
Chemistry